Charles Stafford may refer to:
Charles Stafford (anthropologist), professor of anthropology
Charles Stafford (cricketer), New Zealand cricketer
Charles A. Stafford, U.S. Army medical officer
Charles F. Stafford, American lawyer and judge